Bartholomeus Ruloffs (October 1741 - 13 May 1801) was a Dutch conductor and composer.

Ruloffs was born and died in Amsterdam.  His duties as conductor included conducting the city's Felix Meritis concerts. His new music for Zemire en Azor, a zangspel with scenery and ballets, for Pieter Pypers' 1784 Dutch version of the play by Jean-François Marmontel was a significant early step towards producing an opera in Dutch.

Selected works
Les décréations d’Apollon on les trois symphonies a deux violons, taille et basse obligé, deux flutes et deux corni de chasse tiré des nouveaux opéras français. printed by J.J. Hummel in Amsterdam. 
Music for Zemire en Azor (1784), one of the earliest opera in the Netherlands.
Six sonatas for keyboard (Markordt, 1769)
Derde stukje der muzikale verlustiging (Smit, 1772)
Cantate historique (1777)
Jephta (Kruyff, 1779) a theatrical zangspel.
Marsch-retraite, for the burger company of watch district 40, Hieronimus van Slingelandt
Beurtgezangen , Elk zyn beurt is niet te veel (1785)
Proeve van kleine gedichten voor kinderen; text Hieronymus van Alphen (Gerbrand Roos, 1790)
Tot middernacht (List of tegenlist), zangspel (Helders en Mars, 1791)
Willem Tell (1791)
In triomf (1795)
:nl:De bruiloft van Kloris en Roosje.

References

Further reading
Frijhoff, Willem, and Marijke Spies.  Dutch Culture in a European Perspective.  Uitgeverij Van Gorcum, 2004.
Warrack, John.  The Concise Oxford Dictionary of Opera.  Oxford: Oxford UP, 1996.

1741 births
1801 deaths
Dutch male classical composers
Dutch classical composers
Classical-period composers
Dutch conductors (music)
Male conductors (music)
Musicians from Amsterdam
19th-century Dutch male musicians